"Blame It on the Bossa Nova" is a song written by Cynthia Weil (lyrics) and Barry Mann which was a 1963 hit single for Eydie Gormé, reaching number 7 on the Hot 100 in Billboard in March 1963.  The song also peaked at number 32 in the UK, whereas "Yes, My Darling Daughter" became the biggest hit for Eydie there, reaching number 10.

Background
Produced by Al Kasha who had been responsible for the  1 hit "Go Away Little Girl" by Gormé's husband Steve Lawrence, "Blame It on the Bossa Nova" featured backing vocals by The Cookies. "Blame It on the Bossa Nova" merges the Brill Building Sound with the Latin music which Gormé had previously specialized in. The song describes a romantic relationship of a couple dancing to the bossa nova, "the dance of love." The bossa nova was a Brazilian music style especially in vogue in the United States in the late 1950s through mid-1960s. Steve Lawrence and Eydie Gorme told SiriusXM Radio DJ Lou Simon that when Eydie was first pitched this song, she despised it and did not want to record it, but her label forced her to record the song. She claims she deliberately recorded a mediocre vocal performance, going as far as singing an off-pitch note towards the end of the song with the hope that her label would think her performance was so bad that they would never consider releasing her recording as a single. She was wrong. Her recording reached #7 on the Billboard Hot 100 pop chart and was her biggest, and last, solo hit.

"Blame It on the Bossa Nova" was an international hit for Gormé, reaching  1 in Australia, South Africa and Sweden and  2 in Norway. In the UK the single reached  32. Rendered in Spanish by Gormé as "Cúlpale a la bossa nova", the track sold 250,000 units in Spain and Latin America and 100,000 units in Italy.

Gormé consequently recorded several Top 40-oriented releases but "Blame It on the Bossa Nova" would be her last solo Top 40 hit, although partnered with Lawrence as Steve & Eydie she reached  28 and  35 with respectively "I Want To Stay Here" and "I Can't Stop Talking About You" in 1964. Gormé reached  43 with Mann-Weil's "I Want You to Meet My Baby" in September 1964; that track's B-side : "Can't Get Over (the Bossa Nova)", written by Gormé and Lawrence with Marilyn Gins, gained enough attention to chart at  87. Gormé subsequently shifted back to the easy listening musical style of the first phase of her career.

Chart history

Weekly charts

Year-end charts

Soundtrack appearances
The song has appeared from time to time in television programs, commercials, and films, often for comic effect. For example, in the TV show The West Wing, White House Assistant Counsel Ainsley Hayes (played by Emily Procter) is dancing joyfully to a recording of the song by Annette Funicello, wearing a bathrobe, and drinking a cocktail to celebrate a successful television appearance when she is shocked to see President Jed Bartlet (Martin Sheen) enter her office to meet her for the first time. Former San Francisco 49ers head coach George Seifert performs the song karaoke-style in a Visa commercial that aired during the 1990s. Jack Mac Ferland from Will and Grace sings it too when he prepares his "garlic jazz" in season one.

Movie soundtrack appearances for "Blame It on the Bossa Nova" include The Big Picture (1989), Mermaids (1990) and Doubt (2008). "Blame It on the Bossa Nova" is also featured in episode seven of the first season of the HBO program Big Love. It is playing on the car stereo when character Alby Grant solicits a male prostitute.

David Alan Grier's character, Don 'No Soul' Simmons, covered the song in the end credits for Amazon Women on the Moon.

In the 1993 film Needful Things (based on the Stephen King novel of the same name), the lead character says of the havoc he causes in the town of Castle Rock, "Hey, don't blame me. Blame it on the bossa nova."

Cover versions
"Blame It on the Bossa Nova" was also recorded by Annette Funicello for her 1964 album Annette at Bikini Beach, by Edmundo Ros for his 1965 album Latin Melodies Old and New, and by Cliff Richard for his 1966 album Kinda Latin. Nancy Boyd remade "Blame It on the Bossa Nova" for her 1987 album of classic hit songs entitled Let's Hang On (credited to Nancy Boyd & the Cappello's), with the track issued as the B-side of the single "Maybe I Know" which charted at  56 in the Netherlands.

A recording of "Blame It on the Bossa Nova" by Manuela, with lyrics in German as "Schuld war nur der Bossa Nova" written by Georg Buschor, was on the German Charts for 27 weeks (21 weeks Top 10) during the period 27 April - 2 November 1963, peaking at  1 for five weeks.  Also in 1963, the comedian Jackie Mason recorded a parody version entitled "Don't Blame the Bossa Nova" 

Lola Novaković recorded the Serbian rendering "Bosa Nova" in 1964.

A recording by Anna-Lena Löfgren, with lyrics in Swedish as "Det finns ingenting att hämta" written by Stig Andersson, was at  Svensktoppen for 11 weeks during the period 14 May - 23 July 1967, peaking at  3. Another recording of the Swedish language version by Lotta Engbergs in 1997 appeared on  the album "Tolv i topp", and as B-side of the 2000 single "En liten stund på Jorden".

British singer Jane McDonald released her version as a single in 2005 and was taken from her album "You Belong To Me" that reached No.21 in the UK album charts. 

A Spanish cover by Mexican singer Enrique Guzmán, "Enseñando Bossa Nova", was included in the 1963 LP Celos de ti.

References

External links
 

1963 singles
Bossa nova
Songs written by Barry Mann
Eydie Gormé songs
Number-one singles in Australia
Number-one singles in Germany
Number-one singles in South Africa
Number-one singles in Sweden
Anna-Lena Löfgren songs
Caterina Valente songs
Songs with lyrics by Cynthia Weil
1963 songs
Columbia Records singles